Violent Allies is the ninth studio album by American alternative metal band 10 Years. It was released on September 18, 2020. Its first single, "The Shift", was released ahead of the album in May 2020.

Writing and recording
The band began on work on the album in 2019, deciding to work with music producer Howard Benson. The band had previously worked with Benson on 2010's Feeding the Wolves, but wished to try it again, feeling that issues between band members and their record label at the time kept them from reaching their potential with working with Benson the first time around. The recording sessions began in late 2019, with the band entering the studio with Benson 20 songs already written. Much to their surprise, the sessions were much more challenging than expected, with Benson cutting 75% of the material the band had previously written. This forced the band to write new material on the spot in the studio. Guitarist Brian Vodinh elaborated on the difficult sessions:

Themes and composition
The album's title, Violent Allies, has a dual meaning, representing both the band's strong determination to work together to create a meaningful album, and an allusion to the divisiveness present in modern social and political issues. The latter is a recurring theme across much of the album, and the album's lead single "The Shift". While "The Shift" also contains multiple allusions to the "spreading of a virus," the song was written in late 2019, prior to the Coronavirus outbreak.

Release and promotion
The album's first single, "The Shift", was first released on May 15, 2020, well in advance of the album, which, at the time, was untitled and had no release date, due to the uncertainty in regards to the COVID-19 pandemic. The album's title, Violent Allies, and its release date, September 18, 2020 were announced in mid-July, alongside a new promotional song titled "The Unknown".

Track listing

Personnel
10 Years
 Jesse Hasek – vocals
 Brian Vodinh – guitar, bass, drums, backing vocals, keys, programming 
 Matt Wantland – guitar

Production
 Howard Benson – production
 Joe Rickard - Mixing

Charts

References

2020 albums
10 Years (band) albums
Mascot Records albums